Ruaidhrí Higgins (born 23 October 1984) is a Northern Irish professional football manager and former player, he has been the manager of Derry City F.C. since April 2021.

Career
Higgins, who was born in Limavady, Northern Ireland, began his career at the youth club, Newtown Y.F.C. before being signed by Coventry City in 1998. Higgins signed for Derry City after being released by Coventry City. He made his debut at home against Drogheda United on 14 October 2004. During his time at the Brandywell he won five trophies and played in five European ties.

After Derry City's League of Ireland contract was terminated - after the club admitted holding secondary, unofficial contracts with players - the FAI announced all of the club's players could quit the club. Now a free agent, Higgins had a trial with Aberdeen on 30 November 2009 but manager Mark McGhee reneged on his contract.

Higgins signed for Bohemians in January 2010. After breaking into Pat Fenlon's starting XI, he scored his first league goal for the club on 3 May with the winner against Drogheda United. However, some poor performances saw him regularly start matches on the substitute's bench and he failed to make an impact as Bohs relinquished their league title on goal difference. During the close season of 2010, Higgins was linked with a move back to his former club Derry City.

Higgins re-signed for Derry City in January 2011.

Higgins was released by Derry City at the end of the 2013 season.

On 14 January 2014, Higgins completed a move to Dundalk which saw him re-united with former manager Stephen Kenny.

Higgins then moved to NIFL Premiership side Coleraine and upon leaving the club in 2017,made the decision to retire and take up a coaching role at Dundalk.

In May 2020, Higgins left Dundalk to link up once again with Stephen Kenny, this time with the Republic of Ireland national football team as an opposition analyst.

On 23 April 2021 Higgins was appointed Derry City manager on a 3-and-a-half year contract.

Managerial statistics

Honours

Player
Derry City
FAI Cup (2): 2006, 2012
League of Ireland Cup (5): 2005, 2006, 2007, 2008, 2011

Bohemians
Setanta Sports Cup (1): 2010

Dundalk
League of Ireland (1): 2014
League of Ireland Cup (1): 2014

Manager
Derry City  
 League of Ireland Premier Division
Runners Up: 2022
 FAI Cup
Winners: 2022
Winner: President of Ireland's Cup: 2023

References

External links
 Ruaidhri Higgins Derry City FC player profiles.

1984 births
Living people
Association footballers from Northern Ireland
Northern Ireland under-21 international footballers
League of Ireland players
Coventry City F.C. players
Derry City F.C. players
Bohemian F.C. players
Dundalk F.C. players
Coleraine F.C. players
People from Limavady
League of Ireland XI players
Association football midfielders
Sportspeople from County Londonderry
Derry City F.C. managers